Louisa Watson may refer to
Louisa Watson Peat (1883–1953), Irish-born writer and lecturer
Louisa Brownfield (later Watson, born 1984), English netball player